The 1991 UCI Track Cycling World Championships were the World Championship for track cycling. They took place in Stuttgart, Germany from 13 to 18 August 1991. Fifteen events were contested, 12 for men (5 for professionals, 7 for amateurs) and 3 for women.

Medal summary

Medal table

See also
 1991 UCI Road World Championships

References

Uci Track Cycling World Championships, 1991
Track cycling
UCI Track Cycling World Championships by year
International cycle races hosted by Germany
Sports competitions in Stuttgart
20th century in Baden-Württemberg
UCI Track Cycling World Championships